Vico Torriani (September 21, 1920 in Geneva as Ludovico Oxens Torriani – February 25, 1998 in Agno, Ticino) was a Swiss actor and Schlager singer.

Life
Born in Geneva to a family of Lombard origin, Torriani grew up in St. Moritz where he trained as a cook and pastry chef, already making appearances as a singer. He later opened a restaurant in Basel and wrote  cookbooks. Having won a talent competition in 1945, he toured several West European countries and in 1949 entered the Swiss charts, followed by his breakthrough in West Germany in 1951. The next year he made his debut on Swiss television, later also on the German ARD broadcaster, where he hosted several TV shows with numerous guest stars.

In the 1950s and 1960s he also acted as an actor of musical films, operettas and musical theatre. He competed to represent Germany in the Eurovision Song Contest 1958 but lost to Margot Hielscher. From 1967 he succeeded Lou van Burg hosting the TV show Der goldene Schuß on the West German ZDF broadcaster until the production discontinued in 1970. In the 1970s he attained further success with Schlager and Volkstümliche Musik songs. Torriani received a Bambi lifetime achievement award in 1995.

Selected filmography
 My Wife Is Being Stupid (1952)
 Street Serenade (1953)
 Guitars of Love (1954)
 A Heart Full of Music (1955)
 Santa Lucia (1956)
 The Tour Guide of Lisbon (1956)
 The Star of Santa Clara (1958)
 Robert and Bertram (1961)
 I Must Go to the City (1962)

External links

 
 vicotorriani.ch

1920 births
1998 deaths
Swiss male film actors
20th-century Swiss male singers
German-language singers of Switzerland
Actors from Geneva
20th-century Swiss male actors
ZDF people
Musicians from Geneva